Périgord (/  ) is a natural region and former province of France, which corresponds roughly to the current Dordogne department, now forming the northern part of the administrative region of Nouvelle-Aquitaine. It is divided into four areas called the Périgord Noir (Black), named so for the truffles that can be found there, the Périgord Blanc (White), for chalk cliffs and quarries, the Périgord Vert (Green), for forests and forestry and the Périgord Pourpre (Purple), for wine and viticulture . The geography and natural resources of Périgord make it a region rich in history and wildlife, and the newly created Parc Naturel Régional Périgord-Limousin aims to conserve it as such.

Périgord is noted for its cuisine, especially its duck and goose products, such as confit de canard and foie gras. It is known as a centre for truffles in France. Périgourdine wines include Bergerac (red and white) and Monbazillac.

Geography

Périgord surrounds and is named after the préfecture (capital) of the Dordogne, Périgueux, and also includes Bergerac in the south and Sarlat in the east.

History and prehistory

There are  Roman ruins in Périgueux which have been restored and the whole area is known as the 'cradle of mankind' due to its wealth of prehistoric sites, of which the most famous prehistoric site is the painted cave of Lascaux, whose depictions of aurochs, horses, deer and other animals (but not of humans) date back some 17,000 years.

The centre of pre-historic studies is the small town of les Eyzies, home to the newly rebuilt Museum of Pre-History, where 19th century archaeological investigations established the valley of the Vézère as an unusually rich array of pre-historic sites dating back some 40,000 years. One of UNESCO's World Heritage locations, the valley contains 147 prehistoric sites dating from the Palaeolithic era and 25 decorated caves.

Périgord was one of the main battlegrounds of Hundred Years' War between the French and English in the 14th and 15th centuries. It is also the land of medieval and Renaissance castles like Puymartin, Losse, Hautefort and Beynac situated mainly along the rivers Dordogne and Vézère. Other major castles include Jumilhac-le-Grand, Fénelon, Biron, Bourdeilles, Castelnaud, Puyguilhem and Rouffiac (Angoisse).

In popular culture
A visit to the province inspired the English novelist Julia Stuart to write her novel The Matchmaker of Périgord. Michael Crichton's novel Timeline is partially set in 1357 Périgord. Claude Chabrol  filmed his classic thriller Le Boucher here in 1970, with references to Bergerac and the cinema at Sarlat. The Martin Walker crime novels featuring Bruno Courreges, chief of police, are set in the fictional town of St. Denis on the Vézère river. In Christian Vincent's 2012 film Haute Cuisine (French title: Les Saveurs du Palais), the protagonist Hortense Laborie is a chef from Périgord. The 2013 documentary film After Winter, Spring follows the lives of family farmers in Périgord, including their struggles in the face of real estate development, government agriculture policy, and large agribusiness.

See also

de Talleyrand-Périgord
Bouriane
Périgordian

References

External links

 Dordogne Tourist Highlights 
 Dordogne France Information 
 Préfecture website 

 
Former provinces of France
Geography of Charente
Geography of Dordogne
Geography of Gironde
Geography of Lot (department)
Geography of Lot-et-Garonne
History of Nouvelle-Aquitaine
History of Occitania (administrative region)
History of Charente
History of Dordogne
History of Gironde
History of Lot (department)
History of Lot-et-Garonne
Natural regions of France
Guyenne